Anna Gomis (born 6 October 1973) is a French wrestler who competed in the Women's Freestyle 55 kg at the 2004 Summer Olympics and won the bronze medal.  She was named 1999 Female Wrestler of the Year by the International Federation of Associated Wrestling Styles, and is four times world champion.

References

External links
 

1973 births
Living people
Sportspeople from Tourcoing
French female sport wrestlers
Olympic wrestlers of France
Wrestlers at the 2004 Summer Olympics
Olympic bronze medalists for France
Olympic medalists in wrestling
Medalists at the 2004 Summer Olympics
French sportspeople of Senegalese descent
World Wrestling Championships medalists
Mediterranean Games gold medalists for France
Competitors at the 2001 Mediterranean Games
Competitors at the 2005 Mediterranean Games
Mediterranean Games medalists in wrestling
20th-century French women
21st-century French women